Mark S. Aldenderfer (born 1950) is an American anthropologist and archaeologist. He is the MacArthur Professor of Anthropology at the University of California, Merced where he was previously the Dean of the School of Social Sciences, Humanities, and Arts. He has served as Professor of Anthropology at the University of Arizona, and the University of California, Santa Barbara. Aldenderfer received his Ph.D. from Penn State University in 1977. He is known in particular for his comparative research into high-altitude adaptation, and for contributions to quantitative methods in archaeology. He has also served as editor of several journals in anthropology and archaeology.

Research contributions
His research themes include the origins of settled village life, human adaptation to high altitude environments, hunting and gathering, and early plant and animal domestication. Aldenderfer has made important contributions to understanding the Archaic and Formative period peoples of the south-central Andes through active field projects in southern Peru. He has directed excavation projects at the sites of Asana, Qillqatani, and Jisk'a Iru Muqu, and survey projects in the Osmore valley (Moquegua, Peru) and in river valleys in the Lake Titicaca Basin. Since 1997 he has also conducted research on Buddhist and pre-Buddhist occupations in the Himalaya through field research in far western Tibet. He has also done fieldwork in Mesoamerica, Ethiopia, and in the United States.

Editorial work
From 2008-2018, Aldenderfer served in the role of editor-in-chief for the journal Current Anthropology. He has served as the editor of Latin American Antiquity and the Society for American Archaeology Bulletin (now the SAA Archaeological Record). He is currently a Deputy Editor for the open access journal Science Advances.

Major publications

Papers on Tibetan archeology
d’Alpoim Guedes, J., Lu, H., Li, Y., Spengler, R., Wu, X., and Aldenderfer, M. 2013 Moving Agriculture on the Tibetan Plateau: The Archaeobotanical Evidence. Archaeological and Anthropological Sciences (6): 255-269.
Aldenderfer, M. 2008 On text, materiality, and the Tibetan Buddhist religious architecture at Piyang: 900-1500 CE. In Religion in the Material World, edited by L. Fogelin, pp. 339–358. Center for Archaeological Investigations, Southern Illinois University, Carbondale.
Aldenderfer, M. 2007 Bringing down the mountain: standing stones on the northern and central Tibetan Plateau, 500 BCE-CE 500. In Cult in Context: Reconsidering Ritual in Archaeology, edited by D. Barraclough and C. Malone, pp. 242–248. Oxbow Books, Oxford.
Aldenderfer, M. 2007 Modeling the Neolithic on the Tibetan Plateau. In Late Quaternary Climate Change and Human Adaptation in Arid China, edited by D. Madsen, F. Chen, and X. Gao. Developments in Quaternary Science, Vol. 9. pp. 149–161. Elsevier, Amsterdam.
Aldenderfer, M. 2006 Modeling plateau peoples: The early human use of the world's high plateaux. World Archaeology.38(3): 357-370.
Aldenderfer, M. 2006 Defining Zhang zhung ethnicity: An archaeological perspective from far western Tibet.  In Western Tibet and the Western Himalayas: Essays on History, Literature, Art, and Archaeology. Proceedings of the Tenth IATS, edited by Amy Heller and Giacomella Orofino, pp 1–21. Brill, Leiden.
Aldenderfer, M. 2005 Caves as sacred places on the Tibetan plateau. Expedition.47(3): 8-13. (Also published in Portuguese in the Journal of the Brazilian Speleological Society, 2006)
Aldenderfer, M. and H. Moyes 2005 The Valley of the Eagle: Zhang-zhung, Kyunglung, and the pre-Buddhist sites of far western Tibet. Expedition 47(2): 28-34.
Aldenderfer, M. and Y. Zhang 2004 The prehistory of the Tibetan plateau to the 7th C. AD: Perspectives and research from China and the West since 1950. Journal of World Prehistory 18(1): 1-55.
Aldenderfer, M. and H. Moyes 2004. Excavations at Dindun, a pre-Buddhist village site in far western Tibet. In Proceedings of the First  International Conference on Tibetan Archaeology and Art, edited by Huo Wei and Li Yongxian, pp. 47–69. Center for Tibetan Studies, Sichuan University, Chengdu, China
Aldenderfer, M. 2003. Moving up in the world. American Scientist 91: 542-549. (also published in French in Spektrum de Wissenschaft, 2004)
Aldenderfer, M. 2003 Domestic rdo-ring? A new class of standing stone from the Tibetan plateau. Tibet Journal 28 (1&2): 3-20.
Aldenderfer, M. 2001 Piyang: A 10th/11th C A.D. Tibetan Buddhist temple and monastic complex in far western Tibet. Archaeology, Ethnology, and Anthropology of Eurasia. 4(8): 138-146. (also published in Russian).
Aldenderfer, M. 2001 Roots of Tibetan Buddhism. Archaeology 54(3): 610-12. (Also published in Year of Discovery 2002, Hatherleigh Press, NY)

References

External links

UC Merced Appoints New Dean in School of Social Sciences, Humanities and Arts Accessed 2013-03-20
New Dean Ready to Lead Fastest-Growing School at UC Merced Accessed 2013-03-20

Tibetologists
Living people
1953 births
Pennsylvania State University alumni
University of California, Santa Barbara faculty
University of Arizona faculty